Mark Tyndale (born January 4, 1986) is an American professional basketball coach and former player. He played college basketball for Temple.

College career
Tyndale played college basketball at Temple University. In his junior season, he averaged 19.5 points per game, second in the Atlantic 10 to teammate Dionte Christmas. He received First Team All-Big 5 honors.

As a senior, Tyndale was a Second Team All-Atlantic 10 selection. Along with Pat Calathes, he received the Robert V. Geasey Trophy honoring the best player in the Philadelphia Big 5 in 2008, following his senior season. He averaged 15.9 points and 7.4 rebounds per game that year. Temple reached the 2008 NCAA Men's Division I Basketball Tournament. Temple defeated by Michigan State with a score of 72–61, despite a team-high 16 points from Tyndale.

Professional career
After going undrafted in the 2008 NBA draft, Tyndale moved to Australia and joined the Adelaide 36ers for the 2008–09 NBL season. However, his stint ended in November 2008 and he returned to the United States. In March 2009, he joined the Iowa Energy of the NBA Development League, and stuck with them for the 2009–10 season.

Tyndale played for teams in Germany, Ukraine, and Sweden from 2010 to 2012. The Sioux Falls Skyforce selected Tyndale in the second round of the 2012 NBA Development League Draft, and he joined the team for the 2012–13 season. He was traded to the Maine Red Claws on February 25, 2013. Tyndale was named to the D-League All-Defensive Second Team on April 26. Then between 2013 and 2015, he played in Israel.

On October 31, 2015, Tyndale was selected by the Reno Bighorns in the third round of the 2015 NBA Development League Draft.

On August 23, 2017, Tyndale was selected by the Memphis Hustle in the NBA G League expansion draft.

On February 17, 2018, Tyndale was acquired by the Memphis Hustle.

Coaching career
On September 9, 2019, Tyndale joined the Toronto Raptors as an assistant video coordinators/player development coach.

References

External links
RealGM profile

1986 births
Living people
Adelaide 36ers players
American expatriate basketball people in Australia
American expatriate basketball people in Germany
American expatriate basketball people in Israel
American expatriate basketball people in Sweden
American expatriate basketball people in Ukraine
American men's basketball players
Basketball players from Philadelphia
BC Dnipro players
Elitzur Yavne B.C. players
Ironi Ramat Gan players
Iowa Energy players
Maine Red Claws players
Memphis Hustle players
Reno Bighorns players
Shooting guards
Sioux Falls Skyforce players
Sundsvall Dragons players
Telekom Baskets Bonn players
Temple Owls men's basketball players